Platinum fulminate is a primary explosive which is a fulminate salt of platinum discovered by Edmund Davy.

References

Fulminates
Fulminates